President of the government, chairman of the government, or head of the government is a term used in official statements to describe several Prime Ministers.
 Brunei, Sultan of Brunei Darussalam
 Croatia, Prime Minister of Croatia
 Greece, Prime Minister of Greece,  Πρόεδρος της Κυβέρνησης
 Hong Kong, Chief Executive of Hong Kong
 Lebanon, Prime Minister of Lebanon
 Macau, Chief Executive of Macau
 Morocco, President of the Government of Morocco
 Philippines, Prime Minister of the Philippines (defunct), President of the Philippines
 Serbia, Prime Minister of Serbia
 Slovenia, Prime Minister of Slovenia
 Spain, Prime Minister of Spain, Presidente del Gobierno de España
 Vatican City, President of the Pontifical Commission for Vatican City State
 United States, President of the United States
Chairman of the Government can refer to:
 Russia, Prime Minister of Russia
 Adjara, Chairman of the Government of Adjara
 Slovakia, Prime Minister of Slovakia
 Czech Republic, Prime Minister of the Czech Republic
 Transnistria, Prime Minister of Transnistria

Head of the Government can refer to:
 Austria, Chancellor of Austria
 Algeria, Prime Minister of Algeria
 Germany, Chancellor of Germany
 Tunisia, Prime Minister of Tunisia
 Israel, Prime Minister of Israel
 Switzerland, Chancellor of Switzerland
 Syria, Prime Minister of Syria

See also
 President (government title)

Heads of government
Prime ministers